Myrtle Creek may refer to:

Myrtle Creek, New South Wales, Australia, a locality
Tahmoor, New South Wales, a town that was originally called Myrtle Creek
Myrtle Creek (Victoria), Australia, a stream
Myrtle Creek, Oregon, United States, a city
Myrtle Creek (Curry County, Oregon), a stream
Myrtle Creek (South Umpqua River tributary), a stream in Oregon